La Negra is a small industrial complex  east of Antofagasta, Chile after crossing the coastal mountain range, in the Atacama Desert.

Overview
Among La Negra industries, the two major ones are Altonorte, a copper smelter refinery, and Inacesa, a cement plant. It offers basic services for truckers and travelers in general.

La Negra is also the intersection of the Pan-American Highway and the road from Antofagasta to Escondida Mine. It counts a station on the Salta–Antofagasta railway.

References

External links

Antofagasta
Industry in Chile
Buildings and structures in Antofagasta Region